The snow bunting (Plectrophenax nivalis) is a passerine bird in the family Calcariidae. It is an Arctic specialist, with a circumpolar Arctic breeding range throughout the northern hemisphere. There are small isolated populations on a few high mountain tops south of the Arctic region, including the Cairngorms in central Scotland and the Saint Elias Mountains on the southern Alaska-Yukon border, as well as the Cape Breton Highlands. The snow bunting is the most northerly recorded passerine in the world.

Taxonomy
The snow bunting was formally described by the Swedish naturalist Carl Linnaeus in 1758 in the tenth edition of his Systema Naturae. He placed it with the buntings in the genus Emberiza and coined the binomial name Emberiza nivalis. He specified the locality as Lapland. It is now placed in the genus Plectrophenax that was introduced in 1882 by the Norwegian born zoologist Leonhard Stejneger with the snow bunting as the type species. The genus name Plectrophenax is from Ancient Greek plektron, "cock’s spur", and phenax "imposter", and the specific nivalis is Latin for "snow-white".

The snow bunting was formerly classified in the family Emberizidae, which included American sparrows, buntings, towhees and finches. All these species came into existence after a broad geologically recent radiation of passerine birds. However, it is now part of the narrower family Calcariidae, which also contains the longspurs. Despite the wide distribution of this species there are only very small differences between different phenotypes.

Four subspecies are recognised, which differ slightly in the plumage pattern of breeding males:
P. n. nivalis (Linnaeus, 1758) – Arctic Europe, Arctic North America. Head white, rump mostly black with a small area of white.
P. n. insulae Salomonsen, 1931 – Iceland, Faroe Islands, Scotland. Head white with a blackish collar, rump black.
P. n. vlasowae Portenko, 1937 – Arctic Asia. Head white, rump mostly white.
P. n. townsendi Ridgway, 1887 – Aleutian Islands, Kamchatka, coastal far eastern Siberia. As vlasowae, but slightly larger.

It is very closely related to the Beringian McKay's bunting, which differs in having even more white in the plumage. Hybrids between the two occur in Alaska, and they have been considered conspecific by some authors, though they are generally treated as separate species.

The species also mated with a Lapland Longspur creating a hybrid. The first photographs of this hybrid were taken in April 2011, during its spring migration.

Description

The snow bunting is a sexually dimorphic, medium-sized passerine bird. This passerine is a ground-dwelling species that walks, runs and could potentially jump if needed. It is fairly large and long-winged for a bunting. The bill is yellow with a black tip, and is all black in summer for males. The plumage is white in the underparts and the wings and back have black and white on them. The female and male have a different plumage. During the breeding season, the male is white with black wingtips and a black back, while the female has black wingtips and a rufous back. During the winter, they will both have a rufous colouration in the back. In the spring, the buntings will not go through a moult as other passerines do, instead the breeding colouration comes with the wearing and abrasion of the feathers. Unlike most passerines, it has feathered tarsi, an adaptation to its harsh environment. No other passerine can winter as far north as this species apart from the common raven.

This species is often confused with McKay's bunting (Plectrophenax hyperboreus) due to the similar colouration of their plumage. Even more, the challenge of identification becomes harder when these two species hybridize at the boundaries of their territories. Another similar species is the horned lark, although it has a larger black tail and it has a smaller white patch on the wings.

Vocalizations 
The call is a distinctive rippling whistle, per,r,r,rit and the typical Plectrophenax warble hudidi feet feet feew hudidi.

Snow buntings use vocalizations to communicate among each other and males will have a song to attract the female. The communication calls are done by both the male and the female and they tend to be emitted in flight or in the ground, while the males will often emit the song from a perching position or in a flight display. The males will start singing as soon as they will reach the breeding grounds, and will stop once they find a mate. Studies have shown that the quality and the rate at which a song is emitted affect the reproductive success of a male. The rate of a song measured by the number of strophes per minute is limited by the foraging needs of the male; therefore, a male that is able to sing more frequently shows that he is more successful and effective in his foraging behavior. The song becomes an indicator of the parental care qualities of the male, since having an effective foraging behavior will provide a better probability of survival of the nestlings. Females will then choose their mates based on their song rate.
Within snow buntings, vocalizations in males are unique to each individual, although there is certain syllable sharing between one another. The uniqueness of each song reveals a capacity of recognition between individuals and has an effect in the individual fitness and reproductive success. The songs have duration of 2 seconds and have a frequency of 2 to 6 kHz. Each song is composed of similar and dissimilar figures that create different motifs that will alternate and repeat, resulting in a unique pattern for every male individual.

Distribution and habitat
The snow bunting lives in very high latitudes in the Arctic tundra. There is no apparent limit to its northern range, while the southern range is limited by the duration of daylight, which influences their reproductive activity. This species is found in the high Arctic tundra of North America, Ellesmere Island, Iceland, higher mountains of Scotland, Norway, Russia, North Greenland, Siberia, Novaya Zemlya, and Franz Josef Land. During the winter, this bird migrates to the circumglobal northern temperate zone including the south of Canada, north of the United States, north of Germany, Poland, Ukraine, and east to central Asia. During the last ice age, the snow bunting was widespread throughout continental Europe.

During the breeding period the snow bunting looks for rocky habitats in the Arctic. Since the vegetation in the tundra is low growing, this bird and its nestlings are exposed to predators, and in order to ensure the survival of its offspring, the snow bunting nests in cavities in order to protect the nestlings from any threat. During this period, buntings also look for a habitat rich in vegetation such as wet sedge meadows and areas rich in dryas and lichens. In the winter, they seek open habitats such as farms, barren fields, and lakeshores, where they feed on seeds in the ground.

Migration 
The snow buntings migrate to the Arctic to breed and they are the first migrant species that arrives in these territories. They must gain at least 30% of body mass before migration. The males will arrive first at the beginning of April, when the temperature could reach −30 degrees Celsius. This early migration could be explained by the fact that this species is highly territorial and the quality of the nesting area is crucial to their reproductive success. Females will arrive four to six weeks later, when the snow starts to melt. They tend to migrate in small flocks and have an undulating flight at a moderate height.

The birds overwinter in northern temperate zones in open fields and forms moving flocks that can number into the hundreds. They will leave the Arctic at the middle and end of September, although some will start the migration at the beginning of November. The female leaves first and tends to winter in more southern territories than the male, while the juveniles will leave the Arctic even later than the adults.

The migration is nocturnal and the birds are able to detect the geomagnetic field of the earth in order to guide themselves to their breeding and overwinter territory. The orientation of the snow bunting during migration is independent of any type of visual cue. Furthermore, studies have shown that only those individuals with adequate energy storage will be able to select seasonally appropriate directions during their migration.

Behaviour

Food and feeding 
From the fall to the spring the snow bunting eats a variety of weeds such as knotweed, ragweed, amaranth, goosefoot, aster, and goldenrod and also eats various types of grass seeds. During this season it will forage in the snow collecting seeds from lower stems. During the summer their diet includes seeds of crowberry, bilberry, bistort, dock, poppy, purple saxifrage and invertebrates such as butterflies, true bugs, flies, wasps and spiders. The nestlings are fed exclusively on invertebrates. Snow buntings also prey on basking spiders by throwing rocks around and less regularly they will try to catch invertebrates in flight.

Breeding
Snow buntings have a monogamous behaviour in which the males have a positive impact in the reproductive success of the female, although they are not essential to the survival of the nestling. The male will follow the female during her fertile period to make sure that she will not mate with any other male. The nest sites provide safety but bring other challenges to snow buntings, since in rock cracks and fissures the microclimate could be harsh, the incubation time might be longer for this species and there is a risk that the lower temperatures kill the embryo. To overcome this challenge, the male will bring food to the female during the incubation time, in this way she will be able to constantly control the temperatures of the nest microclimate improving the hatching success and reducing the incubation time.

This passerine lays eggs as soon as the ambient temperature is above 0 degrees Celsius The eggs are blue-green, spotted brown, and hatch in 12–13 days, and the young are already ready to fly after a further 12–14 days.

Courtship behaviour 
The courtship behaviour of snow buntings varies in different parts of the world. In Greenland, the male will have a threat display to ensure his territory. This display will consist of very loud calls, the male will lower its head down and will turn completely to face the newcomer. The males will also have a ceremonial flight to attract the female, in which they will reach a height of 30 to 50 feet, then they will glide, they will sing the song very loudly and will then keep on singing from a perching position.

Effects of climate change on snow bunting populations 
Several indices suggest that climate change could potentially have an important impact on the snow bunting's populations. The Arctic oscillation index (AO) is a regional climate index that helps to predict ecological processes. In the Arctic, when the AO index is in a positive phase, there are higher winter temperatures and precipitation, followed by an earlier and warmer spring, and the summer is cloudy and humid with lower temperatures. Usually the AO index tends to oscillate from a positive to a negative phase, but during the last past 40 years, the AO index has remained in the positive phase. Studies have shown that warmer springs trigger an early breeding behavior in the snow buntings that mismatches the peak of their food sources, leading to a lower success rate of the hatchlings. Even more, the higher temperatures will bring to the Arctic other species that will compete with the snow bunting. It is also thought that higher temperatures might allow greater survival of second broods in the snow bunting species.

Gallery

References

External links
 Snow Bunting Species Account - Cornell Lab of Ornithology
 Snow Bunting - Plectrophenax nivalis - USGS Patuxent Bird Identification InfoCenter
 Stamps (with world range map) at bird-stamps.org
 
 
 Snow Bunting Images - ARKive
 
 The Birds of North America Online
 Audubon Guide to North American Birds
 Bird Web: Snow Bunting
 Wild Bird Habitat Store

snow bunting
Birds of the Arctic
Native birds of Alaska
Birds of Iceland
snow bunting
Taxa named by Carl Linnaeus
Holarctic birds